De Ijazat Jo Tu is a Pakistani romantic drama serial that was first aired on 13 October 2014. It had 20 episodes. This was last aired on 18 December 2014.

Summary 
De Ijazat Jo Tu story revolves around the love story of Sarmad (Farhan Saeed) and Ayla (Sohai Ali Abro).  While Ayla comes from a middle-class background with a doting family, Sarmad comes from a rich background but is distant from his father due to his father's busy schedule. His stepmother doesn't care about him nor does his stepbrother.

Ayla's entry into Sarmad's life is a blessing for him and he feels his loneliness disappearing.  Sarmad and Ayla get married, much to the dismay of his stepmother and are forced to move into their own home due to her disapproval (despite having support from her family and his father).

At present, Ayla and Sarmad have a baby girl, but Sarmad's father (Javed Sheikh) has gone missing after boarding a flight and is assumed to be dead.  The show took an 8-year leap. On Ayla's birthday, Sarmad forgets a new gift for his wife in the market. Sarmad, by the permission of his mother (Saba Hameed) and his wife left to retrieve it. After returning, his car was collided by a car. He survived in Hospital but after talking to his wife, he took his last breath and suddenly died. His death suddenly shocked his family. Even the family haven't enjoyed any joy after his death in their life.

Cast 

 Farhan Saeed as Sarmad (Protagonist)
 Sohai Ali Abro as Aiyla (Protagonist)
 Yasir Ali Khan as Faizi
 Humaira Bano as Faizi's Mother
 Inayat Khan as Ahsan, Sarmad's Friend
 Mehjabeen
 Hina Aman
 Zeeshan
 Tariq Jameel as Ayla's Father
 Atif Rathore as Tahir
 Javed Sheikh as Sarmad's Father 
 Saba Hameed as Sarmad's Mother (Antagonist)
 Azfar Rehman as Bunty

References

External links 
 Hum TV Official Website

Pakistani romance television series
Television series about families
Pakistani drama television series
2014 Pakistani television series debuts
2014 Pakistani television series